Krieglstein is a German language habitational surname. Notable people with the name include:

 Eugen Binder von Krieglstein (1873–1914), Austrian journalist
 Kerstin Krieglstein (1963), German neuroscientist
 Maryann Krieglstein (1944), American academic social worker
 Werner Krieglstein (1941), American scholar, director and actor

References 

German-language surnames
German toponymic surnames